Scott Reid is a political analyst and commentator currently working for CTV News, Newstalk 1010AM and writing columns for a variety of news organizations including the Ottawa Citizen, CBC.ca, Macleans and others. He is a former political advisor to a number of Canadian politicians, having served as Advisor and Director of Communications in the Prime Minister's Office of Canadian Prime Minister Paul Martin. Along with Macleans columnist Scott Feschuk, he also owns and operates Feschuk.Reid a strategic communications and speechwriting consultancy.

Biography 
Scott Reid is a communications and speechwriting professional at Feschuk.Reid who has advised many of Canada's leading corporate executives and political leaders. He also works as a political analyst and commentator on television, radio and print.

Reid has a B.A. in history and politics from Queen's University. In the early 1990s he worked in the national office of the Liberal Party of Canada in support of the party’s 1993 election sweep. He then went on to work for Earnscliffe Strategy Group, a political consulting firm closely tied to Paul Martin. From 1997 to 2001 he worked as Senior Advisor and Communications Director to Finance Minister Paul Martin – a position he maintained during Martin’s time as Prime Minister from 2003-2006. Reid has been an advisor to many federal and provincial leaders and has served in senior communication capacities on national, provincial and municipal election campaigns.

Ahead of the 2006 Canadian federal election, Reid came under heavy criticism after attacking a Conservative Party of Canada policy proposal to directly give families funding for childcare, declaring that "don't give people 25 bucks a week to blow on beer and popcorn." He later apologised for the statement. The quote was cited by some commentators as one of the decisive moments of the 2006 election, contributing to a perception of the Liberal Party as out-of-touch elitists and to their eventual defeat.

In 2006, Reid teamed up with Maclean’s award-winning magazine columnist Scott Feschuk to found Feschuk.Reid, a communications consultancy dedicated to strategic and corporate communications, speechwriting and executive counsel. Feschuk.Reid has served a wide number of high-profile clients including Royal Bank of Canada, Bank of Montreal, BlackRock, Caisse de dépôt, FedEx, Microsoft, TELUS, Magna, Greyhound, Maple Leaf Foods, Enbridge, Hydro One and other private, public and not-for-profit clients.

In 2011, Reid joined CTV as a co-anchor for the National Affairs business and politics program on CTV News Channel. Reid appears regularly as a commentator on CTV, CBC and TSN, in addition to writing for the Globe and Mail, Ottawa Citizen and Macleans.ca.

Reid is a Fellow at Carleton University’s School of Political Management and serves as a frequent guest lecturer.

References

External links
Feschuk Reid

Canadian political consultants
Year of birth missing (living people)
Living people
Canadian television news anchors
Communications directors of the Canadian Prime Minister's Office